Lorman may refer to:

Barbara Lorman, American politician
Lorman, Mississippi, unincorporated community in the United States